LD Entertainment, LLC (formerly known as Liddell Entertainment) is an independent American film studio and sales company, founded in 2007 by Mickey Liddell, which finances, produces, acquires and distributes full-length theatrical motion pictures.

The company is headquartered in Los Angeles, California, and is run by Mickey Liddell, who formerly worked with Greg Berlanti at Berlanti/Liddell Productions. It expects to produce and release four to six films a year with production budgets of up to $25 million.

Filmography

References

External links
 

Film production companies of the United States
American companies established in 2007
Companies based in Los Angeles
American independent film studios